Tylozygus bifidus is a species of sharpshooter in the family Cicadellidae.

References

Further reading

External links

 
 

Insects described in 1830
Cicadellini